Fago is a town and municipality located in the province of Huesca, Aragon, Spain. Its Postal Code is 22729

On 13 January 2007, the mayor of Fago town, Miguel José Grima Masiá, was murdered by his political enemy, Santiago Mainar Sauras.

References

External links 
 CAI Aragón-Fago
 www.valledeanso.com/fago News on Fago

Municipalities in the Province of Huesca